Gremyachka is a rural locality in Mokovsky Selsoviet Rural Settlement, Kursky District, Kursk Oblast, Russia. Population:

Geography 
The village is located on the Mokva River (a right tributary of the Seym River basin), 87 km from the Russia–Ukraine border, 5 km north-west of Kursk, 3 km from the selsoviet center – 1st Mokva.

 Streets
There are the following streets in the locality: Chernikov bok, Fruktovaya, Kreshchenskaya, Lugovaya, Molodyozhnaya, Molodyozhny pereulok, Pravoslavnaya, Rozhdestvenskaya, Strelkovaya, Shirokaya, Trudovaya and Uspenskaya (204 houses).

 Climate
Gremyachka has a warm-summer humid continental climate (Dfb in the Köppen climate classification).

Transport 

The rural locality is situated 14 km from Kursk Vostochny Airport, 127 km from Belgorod International Airport and 217 km from Voronezh Peter the Great Airport.

References

Notes

Sources

Rural localities in Kursky District, Kursk Oblast